Henri Masson may refer to:
 Henri Masson (fencer)
 Henri Masson (artist)